Constantine Joseph Smyth (December 4, 1859 – April 14, 1924) was Chief Justice of the Court of Appeals of the District of Columbia.

Education and career

Born on December 4, 1859, in County Cavan, Ireland, Smyth read law in 1885. He entered private practice in Omaha, Nebraska from 1885 to 1913. He was a member of the Nebraska House of Representatives in 1887. He was a member of the Omaha School Board from 1889 to 1894. He was Chairman of the Nebraska State Democratic Committee from 1894 to 1896. He was Attorney General of Nebraska from 1897 to 1900. He was an associate dean and professor at Creighton University School of Law from 1905 to 1910. He received an Artium Magister degree in 1907 from Creighton University. He was a special assistant to the Attorney General of the United States from 1913 to 1917.

Federal judicial service

Smyth was nominated by President Woodrow Wilson on June 29, 1917, to the Chief Justice seat on the Court of Appeals of the District of Columbia (now the United States Court of Appeals for the District of Columbia Circuit) vacated by Chief Justice Seth Shepard. He was confirmed by the United States Senate on July 12, 1917, and received his commission the same day. His service terminated on April 14, 1924, due to his death.

References

Sources
 
 

1859 births
1924 deaths
19th-century Irish people
Politicians from County Cavan
Irish emigrants to the United States (before 1923)
Creighton University faculty
United States court of appeals judges appointed by Woodrow Wilson
Judges of the United States Court of Appeals for the D.C. Circuit
20th-century American judges
Nebraska Attorneys General
Members of the Nebraska House of Representatives
School board members in Nebraska
United States federal judges admitted to the practice of law by reading law